Kuala Lumpur Metropolitan University College (KLMUC) is a university college located in Kuala Lumpur, Malaysia. It was established in 1991. The College currently offers over 17 programmes in 3 distinctive faculties.

The degree and diploma courses are accredited by the Malaysian Qualifications Agency.

KLMUC offers a wide range of academic programs at the diploma, bachelor's, and master's levels in various fields, including business, accounting, hospitality, tourism, information technology, communication, and design. 

Some of the popular courses offered at KLMUC include the Bachelor of Business Administration (BBA), Diploma in Accounting, Bachelor of Arts (Hons) in Graphic Design, Bachelor of Science (Hons) in Information Technology, and Master of Business Administration (MBA).

Faculties
 Faculty of Creative Arts
 Faculty of Management & Business Technology
 Centre of Innovation & Entrepreneurship Education

Transportation
The campus is accessible from Sultan Ismail LRT Station.

Notable alumni
 Richard Huckle (did not complete his studies)

References

External links
 

Private universities and colleges in Malaysia
Colleges in Malaysia
Universities and colleges in Kuala Lumpur
1991 establishments in Malaysia
Educational institutions established in 1991